Sceloporus becki, also known as the island fence lizard, is an endemic lizard to the Channel Islands of California.

Taxonomy
It was once considered a subspecies of the western fence lizard (Sceloporus occidentalis), but is now considered to be its own species.

Etymology
The specific epithet, becki, is in honor of Rollo Howard Beck, an American ornithologist who collected the first specimens.

References

Flaxington, William (2005). Photograph of Island fence lizard on Santa Cruz Island. Calphotos

External links
 National Park Service, Channel Islands - Island Fence Lizard U.S. Department of the Interior
 Island Fence Lizard - Sceloporus occidentalis becki CaliforniaHerps.com A Guide to the Amphibians and Reptiles of California

Sceloporus
Endemic fauna of California
Fauna of the Channel Islands of California
Fauna of the California chaparral and woodlands
Lizards of North America
Reptiles of the United States
Reptiles described in 1905
Taxa named by John Van Denburgh
Fauna without expected TNC conservation status